Set Free may refer to:

Set Free (1918 film), an American comedy film
Set Free (1927 film), an American silent western film
Set Free (EP), a 1978 EP by Patti Smith Group
Set Free, a 1989 album by Constance Demby
Set Free (album), a 2005 album by The American Analog Set